Le Châtelard is a commune in the Savoie department in the Auvergne-Rhône-Alpes region in south-eastern France.

Geography
The village is located above the right bank of the Chéran, which flows northwestward through the middle of the commune.

See also
Communes of the Savoie department

References

Communes of Savoie